Bertozzi is a surname. Notable people with the surname include:

Andrea Bertozzi (born 1965), American mathematician
Carolyn Bertozzi (born 1966), American chemist and Nobel laureate

Surnames from given names
Italian-language surnames